Wong Sing (born 14 June 1943), better known by his stage name Ha Yu, is a Hong Kong actor who has been working on the television network TVB since the 1970s.

Biography
Wong was born in Guangzhou, Guangdong, China, in 1946. He went to Hong Kong in 1962 and worked as a part-time actor during his studies there. Later, he joined the television station Rediffusion (now ATV) as an actor and adopted the stage name "Ha Yu". He switched to another station, TVB, in 1974 and acted in a number of television series produced by TVB, especially in adaptations of wuxia novels by Gu Long. In early 1987, Wong co-hosted the variety show An Evening With the Stars (群斗星會) aired on the Taiwanese television network TTV.

He immigrated to Vancouver, Canada in 1994. During that period, he returned to Hong Kong in 1997 to film for ATV, and in 2000, Wong returned to TVB and acted in some television series again. He won Best Supporting Actor at the 2005 TVB Anniversary Awards for his portrayal of a useless son in the sitcom My Family. In 2007, Wong acted in a few TVB dramas, most notably as "Dai Bau" in Heart of Greed. He won Best Actor at the 2008 TVB Anniversary Awards for his role as "Gam Tai Jo" in Moonlight Resonance.

Filmography

Film
 The Fun, the Luck & the Tycoon 吉星拱照 (1989)
 Jianghu Dream (1993)
 Love for All Seasons 百年好合 (2003)
 Dragon Reloaded (2005)
 Kung Fu Mahjong 3 雀聖3 (2007)
 The Vampire Who Admires Me 有只僵尸暗恋你(2008)
 Perfect Rivals 美好冤家 (2011)
 ATM 提款機 (2015)

TVB Series

MediaCorp TV Channel 8 series

Awards and nominations
 2008: Moonlight Resonance (Best Actor) 
 2005 : My Family (Best Supporting Actor)

References

|-
!colspan="3" style="background: #DAA520;" | TVB Anniversary Awards

TVB veteran actors
Hong Kong male film actors
Hong Kong male television actors
Male actors from Guangzhou
1946 births
Living people
Male actors from Guangdong
20th-century Hong Kong male actors
21st-century Hong Kong male actors
Chinese male film actors
Chinese male television actors
20th-century Chinese male actors
21st-century Chinese male actors